Wee Too Beach is a resort village in the Canadian province of Saskatchewan within Census Division No. 6. It is on the shores of Last Mountain Lake in the Rural Municipality of Sarnia No. 221.

History 
Wee Too Beach incorporated as a resort village on January 1, 1986.

Demographics 

Government 
The Resort Village of Wee Too Beach is governed by an elected municipal council and an appointed administrator that meets on the last Tuesday of every month. The mayor is Kevin Peachey and its administrator is Gail Meyer.

See also 
List of communities in Saskatchewan
List of municipalities in Saskatchewan
List of resort villages in Saskatchewan
List of villages in Saskatchewan
List of summer villages in Alberta

References

External links 

Resort villages in Saskatchewan
Sarnia No. 221, Saskatchewan
Division No. 6, Saskatchewan